The men's team table tennis event was part of the table tennis programme at the 2016 Summer Olympics in Rio de Janeiro. The event took place from Friday 12 August to Wednesday 17 August 2016 at Riocentro.

The medals were presented by Yu Zaiqing, IOC Vice President and Melecio Rivera, Executive Vice President of the ITTF.

Qualification

Schedule
All times are Brasília Time (UTC−3).

Seeds
Team ranking was based on the individual ITTF rating points of 30 July 2016 but was taken into consideration only the players qualified from each team.

Bracket

Results

First round

Quarterfinals

Semifinals

Bronze medal match

Gold medal match

References

External links
 Official site of the Rio 2016 Olympic and Paralympic Games
 Results Book : Rio 2016. Organising Committee for the Olympic and Paralympic Games in Rio in 2016.
 

Men's team
Men's events at the 2016 Summer Olympics